Maguindanao's at-large congressional district was a short-lived congressional district that encompassed the entire province of Maguindanao in the Philippines. It was represented in the Batasang Pambansa from 1984 to 1986. The province of Maguindanao was created by the further division of Cotabato into three provinces in 1973 out of thirteen ethnic Maguindanao-dominated municipalities of the former province. Due to the absence of a legislature since the 1972 imposition of martial law, no electoral district was formed in the new province under its charter. When a national parliament known as the Batasang Pambansa was convened in 1978, Maguindanao and four other provinces in Central Mindanao were collectively represented by eight delegates who were elected across Region XII. The only time a provincewide at-large district was used to elect representatives for Maguindanao was during the 1984 Philippine parliamentary election for two seats in the Regular Batasang Pambansa shared with the chartered city of Cotabato.

The district was eliminated following the 1987 apportionment which created two districts in the province of Maguindanao under a new constitution. It briefly resurfaced after the province's 1st district was carved out to form the short-lived province of Shariff Kabunsuan in 2006 leaving the 2nd district as the sole constituency in what remained of the province for the 2007 Philippine House of Representatives elections. A 2008 decision by the Supreme Court nullified the new province and Maguindanao reverted to two-district configuration by the 2010 Philippine House of Representatives elections.

Representation history

See also
Legislative districts of Maguindanao

References

Former congressional districts of the Philippines
1984 establishments in the Philippines
1986 disestablishments in the Philippines
At-large congressional districts of the Philippines
Congressional districts of Bangsamoro
Constituencies established in 1984
Constituencies disestablished in 1986
Constituencies established in 2006
Constituencies disestablished in 2008